Year 206 (CCVI) was a common year starting on Wednesday (link will display the full calendar) of the Julian calendar. At the time, it was known as the Year of the Consulship of Umbrius and Gavius (or, less frequently, year 959 Ab urbe condita). The denomination 206 for this year has been used since the early medieval period, when the Anno Domini calendar era became the prevalent method in Europe for naming years.

Events 
 By place 
 Roman Empire 
 Hadrian's Wall is retaken for the first time, since the Pictish uprising of 180.
 Emperor Septimius Severus comes to Britain, with his sons Caracalla and Geta.

Births 
 Trebonianus Gallus, Roman emperor (d. 253)
 Wang Jun (or Shizhi), Chinese general (d. 286)

Deaths 
 Gao Gan, Chinese warlord, politician 
 Taishi Ci (or Ziyi), Chinese general (b. 166)
 Ying Shao, Chinese politician, writer (b. 140)

References